Molly Hamley-Clifford (born Irene Leila Hamley Clifford; 1 August 1887 – 7 June 1956) was a British stage and film actress.

Early life
Clifford was born on 1 August 1887 in Exeter the daughter of George W and Eliza Clifford.

Selected filmography
 Milestones (1916)
 Merely Mrs. Stubbs (1917)
 The Cobweb (1917)
 Spinner o' Dreams (1918)
 The Flying Fool (1931)
 What a Night! (1931)
 Temptation (1934)
 Leave It to Blanche (1934)
 Joy Ride (1935)
 Pay Box Adventure (1936)
 Ticket of Leave (1936)
 Under Secret Orders (1937)
 There Was a Young Man (1937)
 Easy Riches (1938)
 Murder Tomorrow (1938)
 Paid in Error (1938)
 Miracles Do Happen (1939)
 Contraband (1940)
 Deadlock (1943)
 Tawny Pipit (1944)
 Dark Secret (1949)
 Kind Hearts and Coronets (1949)
 The Magnet (1950)
 Meet Mr. Lucifer (1953)
 Street of Shadows (1953)
 The Million Pound Note (1954)
 The Feminine Touch (1956)

References

Bibliography
 Goble, Alan. The Complete Index to Literary Sources in Film. Walter de Gruyter, 1999.

External links

1887 births
1956 deaths
British stage actresses
British film actresses
Actors from Exeter